Vysokovo is a rural locality (a village) in Rostilovskoye Rural Settlement, Gryazovetsky District, Vologda Oblast, Russia. The population was 2 as of 2002.

Geography 
Vysokovo is located 28 km south of Gryazovets (the district's administrative centre) by road. Pochatkovo is the nearest rural locality.

References 

Rural localities in Gryazovetsky District